"You're the One" is a duet by Máire Brennan and Shane MacGowan taken from the soundtrack to the motion picture Circle of Friends. A promotional video was made to accompany the single featuring clips from the film in addition specially recorded shots of Máire and Shane. The two B-sides to the single are taken from Shane's album The Snake.

Track listing
Compact Disc
"You're the One"
"Aisling"
"Victoria"

References

1995 singles
Songs written for films
Songs written by Shane MacGowan
Songs written by Michael Kamen
1995 songs
ZTT Records singles